Charles Kistner Pringle (born May 13, 1931) is an American politician. He served as a Republican member of the Mississippi House of Representatives.

Life and career 
Pringle was born in Avon Park, Florida. He was an attorney.

In 1964, Pringle was elected to the Mississippi House of Representatives, winning a special election after Harry G. Walker resigned.

References 

1931 births
Living people
People from Avon Park, Florida
Republican Party members of the Mississippi House of Representatives
20th-century American politicians